Fanny Rinne (born 15 April 1980 in Mannheim, Baden-Württemberg) is a field hockey midfielder from Germany.

International senior tournaments

 1999 – Champions Trophy, Brisbane (3rd place)
 1999 – European Nations Cup, Cologne (2nd place)
 2000 – Olympic Qualifying Tournament, Milon Keynes (3rd place)
 2000 – Champions Trophy, Amstelveen (2nd place)
 2000 – Summer Olympics, Sydney (7th place)
 2002 – European Indoor Nations Cup, France (1st place)
 2002 – World Cup, Perth (7th place)
 2003 – World Indoor Nations Cup, Leipzig (1st place)
 2003 – Champions Challenge, Catania (1st place)
 2003 – European Nations Cup, Barcelona (3rd place)
 2004 – Olympic Qualifier, Auckland (4th place)
 2004 – Summer Olympics, Athens (1st place)
 2004 – Champions Trophy, Rosario (2nd place)
 2005 – European Championship, Dublin (2nd)
 2006 – World Cup, Madrid (8thplace)
 2007 – European Championship, Manchester (1st place)
 2007 – Champions Trophy, Quilmes (3rd place)
 2008 – Champions Trophy, Mönchengladbach (2nd place)
 2008 – Summer Olympics, Beijing (4th place)

References
Profile on Hockey Olympica
Personal website

External links
 

 
 

1980 births
Living people
Sportspeople from Mannheim
German female field hockey players
Olympic field hockey players of Germany
Field hockey players at the 2000 Summer Olympics
Field hockey players at the 2004 Summer Olympics
Field hockey players at the 2008 Summer Olympics
Olympic gold medalists for Germany
Olympic medalists in field hockey
Field hockey players at the 2012 Summer Olympics
Medalists at the 2004 Summer Olympics
20th-century German women
21st-century German women